Shan Tao (205 – 3 March 283), courtesy name Juyuan, was one of the Seven Sages of the Bamboo Grove, a group of Chinese Taoist scholars, writers and musicians who lived in the 3rd century. Shan also was an official of Cao Wei and Western Jin.

References

 Fang, Xuanling, "Book of Jin (Jin Shu)".

Seven Sages of the Bamboo Grove
205 births
283 deaths
Cao Wei politicians
Jin dynasty (266–420) politicians
Political office-holders in Hebei
Politicians from Jiaozuo